The Missile Stakes is an Australian Turf Club Group 2 Thoroughbred horse race for three year olds and older run at Weight for Age over a distance of 1200 metres at Randwick Racecourse, Sydney, Australia in August.  Prizemoney is A$200,000.

History
The race was first run in 1978. The event is the first Group race in the new racing calendar in New South Wales.

Grade
 1978–1979 - Principal Race
 1980–2013 - Group 3
 2014 onwards - Group 2

Venue
 1978–2011 - Rosehill  
 2012 - Warwick Farm
 2013 onwards - Randwick

Distance
 1978–2009 - 1100 metres
 2010 onwards - 1200 metres

Winners

 2021 - Phobetor
 2020 - Eduardo
 2019 - Alizee
 2018 - Pierata
 2017 - Invincible Gem
 2016 - Tycoon Tara
 2015 - Burbero
 2014 - Sweet Idea
 2013 - Rain Affair
 2012 - Pinwheel
 2011 - Rain Affair
 2010 - Love Conquers All
 2009 - Teasing
 2008 - Captain Bax
 2007 - German Chocolate
 2006 - Imprisoned
 2005 - Dance Hero
 2004 - Spark Of Life
 2003 - Pompeii
 2002 - Lonhro
 2001 - Sportsbrat
 2000 - Padstow
 1999 - Commands
 1998 - Mr. Victory
 1997 - Guineas
 1996 - Legal Agent
 1995 - Brawny Spirit
 1994 - Klokka
 1993 - Klokka
 1992 - Joanne
 1991 - Joanne
 1990 - Potrero
 1989 - Select Prince
 1988 - Campaign King
 1987 - Campaign King
 1986 - Shankhill Lass
 1985 - Row Of Waves
 1984 - Plus Vite
 1983 - Young Blood
 1982 - Nordic Prince 
 1982 - Razor Sharp 
 1981 - race not held
 1980 - Macho 
 1979 - Salaam
 1978 - Idol

See also
 List of Australian Group races
 Group races

References

Horse races in Australia
Open sprint category horse races